Torreperogil is a town over 7,500 inhabitants in Province of Jaén, Andalucia, Spain. Their people in the "comarca"(region) are known by the use of the exclamatory phrase "¡Bárcia!".Other places in this municipality are El Paso where you can have a picnic or barbecue, Los Pinos, El Prado is a square you can walk and see the Cazorla Mountains, and Las Torres Oscuras.  Las Torres Oscuras are the oldest part of the town, with architecture of the Middles Ages. It is also the location of several non-permanent events.

History
The town was founded by a knight called Pero Xil when in the 13th century he built a tower. The town grew up around this tower. Pero Xil was an example of the Cristian Knight powerful who lived in La Loma de Úbeda. Pero Xil collaborated in the conquest of Ubeda under the orders of Ferdinand III of Castile in 1231.

The Xil's family governed the town until 1369. Under Civil War Castilian in 14th century, The IV lord Gil supported the King Pedro I de Castilla, due to Peter the Cruel was killed by his  half-brother and candidate to the throne of Castille Enrique II, Lord Gil died in Montiel with Peter the Cruel. As reward, Ubeda's Knights who supported Enrique II, Enrique II gave the control of the town to Úbeda.

Torreperogil was independent to Úbeda in 1639. This independence was given by the king Felipe IV.

During the next centuries, the historical district was consolidated. In the 19th century, the town had an urban expansion through new construction: The Paseo del Prado.

Torreperogil was famous in the fight against the French during the Spanish Independence War in 1808. Torreperogil was the first town that proclaimed Alfonso XII in the end of the century.

Torreperogil is a peaceful, charming place where you can remember the Middle Ages.

Elections
In the municipal elections in 2015, the majority of councilors were won by the Partido Socialista Obrero Español party.

References

Municipalities in the Province of Jaén (Spain)